Mbelime, or Niende, is an Eastern Oti-Volta Gur language of northwestern Benin. Mbelime is spoken by approximately 131,000 people. 
There is a Mbelime dictionary.

References

Oti–Volta languages
Languages of Benin